The Ant and the Aardvark is a series of 17 theatrical short cartoons produced at DePatie–Freleng Enterprises and released by United Artists from 1969 to 1971.

Plot 
The cartoon series follows attempts of a blue aardvark (voiced by John Byner, imitating Jackie Mason) attempting to catch and eat a red ant named Charlie (also voiced by Byner, imitating Dean Martin), usually doing so by inhaling with a loud vacuum cleaner sound. The aardvark character is essentially unnamed; in the episode "Rough Brunch", he claims his name is simply "Aardvark". Despite this, and his identification in the series title as an aardvark, in many of the shorts he refers to himself (and is referred to by the ant) as an anteater. The ant gives his nemesis a variety of names as sly terms of endearment (Ol' Sam, Ol' Ben, Ol' Blue, Claude, Pal, Buddy, Daddy-O). In several bumper sequences of The Pink Panther Show, he is called "Blue Aardvark".

Production 
The Ant and the Aardvark series was originally released by United Artists. Seventeen theatrical shorts were produced in the original series, and were subsequently featured in various television syndication packages, usually shown with DFE's other characters such as the Pink Panther and The Inspector. Most of the 17 entries appear in their television syndication form (complete with an audible laugh track added by NBC-TV) on the video on demand service Amazon Video.

When The Ant and the Aardvark first appeared on The New Pink Panther Show in the fall of 1971, the series became wildly popular, so much in fact that the duo became a featured part of the NBC series. Even though the 17 entries remained popular throughout the broadcast run of The Pink Panther Show, no new entries were produced.

The series used several unique production techniques for the period. The aardvark's body was solid blue: his only clothes—a pair of blue shorts and matching T-shirt—were a matching blue. Similarly, Charlie Ant was solid red, and did not sport any clothing. As such, the character's solid colors allowed them to stand out clearly against the multi-colored backgrounds featured prominently in the series. Charlie also sported half-closed eyes, as a sign of a bon viveur.

Musical director Doug Goodwin was responsible for the jazzy music score. Goodwin assembled an established group of jazz session musicians to perform the series' theme music and musical cues. For the first time in animated cartoons, all six musicians—Ray Brown, Billy Byers, Pete Candoli, Shelly Manne, Jimmy Rowles and Tommy Tedesco—received on-screen credit.

Art Leonardi was responsible for the main title graphic for all DePatie-Freleng entries. For The Ant and the Aardvark series, Leonardi expanded on a technique first introduced for the first Pink Panther cartoon, The Pink Phink. This entailed tearing paper into the forms of objects and characters to form stylized images.

Additional characters 
There were additional minor characters in the series. Among them were the following:

 Computer (voiced by John Byner) - a computer that the aardvark built to help come up with ideas to catch the ant (Technology, Phooey)
 Cousin Term the Termite (Rough Brunch)
 Aunt Minerva - one of the Gi-ants (The Ant From Uncle)
 Tiny the Elephant, an ape, and a look-alike of Roland (from another DePatie-Freleng series, Roland and Rattfink) - Charlie Ant's lodge brothers (Mumbo Jumbo)
 An unnamed green aardvark - he is similar to the blue aardvark except barrel-chested instead of pot-bellied (I've Got Ants In My Plans, Odd Ant Out)
 Tiger (voiced by Marvin Miller) - a tiger that helped Charlie (Scratch a Tiger)
 A scientist (Science Friction)
 A nurse at an animal hospital (voiced by Athena Lorde) - she tended to the ant and the aardvark when they ended up in her hospital (From Bed to Worse)
 An anteater-eating shark (Isle of Caprice)
 A nearsighted lifeguard - despite wearing glasses, he tends to mistake the Aardvark for a dog (Dune Bug)
 A toastmaster ant - an ant (I've Got Ants in My Plans)

International versions 
 In the German dub, the Aardvark is a female anteater named Elise (Eliza) voiced by Marianne Wischmann while Charlie (voiced by Fred Maire) remains male. The cartoons are known under the title Die blaue Elise ("The Blue Eliza").
 In the Latin American Spanish dub, the Aardvark is a male anteater voiced by Pedro D'Aguillón (original dub) and Javier Rivero (dub on some re-airings). Charlie (voiced by Álvaro Carcaño and Salvador Nájar) remains unchanged. The series title is La hormiga y el Oso hormiguero ("The Ant and the Anteater").
 In the Brazilian Portuguese dub the Aardvark is an anteater voiced by Ionei Silva. The series title is changed to A Formiga e o Tamanduá ("The Ant and the Anteater").
 In the European Portuguese dub the aardvark remains an aardvark.
 In the French dub, the Aardvark is a male anteater voiced by Michel Gatineau while Charlie is voiced by actress Marcelle Lajeunesse. The title is known as Tamanoir et Fourmi Rouge ("Aardvark and Red Ant").

Films
All voices provided by John Byner unless otherwise noted.

Credits 
 Producers: David H. DePatie, Friz Freleng
 Directors: Friz Freleng, Hawley Pratt, Gerry Chiniquy, Art Davis
 Story: John W. Dunn, Irv Spector, Dave Detiege, Sid Marcus, Larz Bourne, Dale Hale
 Animation: Warren Batchelder, Manny Gould, Manny Perez, Don Williams, Art Leonardi, Robert Taylor, Bob Goe, Tom Ray, Lloyd Vaughan, Bob Richardson, John Gibbs, Phil Roman, Robert Bentley, Ken Muse, Irv Spence
 Graphic Designers: Corny Cole, Dick Ung, Al Wilson, Lin Larsen
 Voices: John Byner, Marvin Miller, Athena Lorde
 Color Designer: Tom O'Laughlin, Richard H. Thomas
 Title Cards: Art Leonardi
 Production Supervisor: Jim Foss
 Coordinator: Harry Love
 Camera: John Burton Jr.
 Film Editor: Lee Gunther
 Musical Director: Doug Goodwin
 Musicians:
 Ray Brown - bass
 Billy Byers - trombone
 Pete Candoli - trumpet
 Jimmy Rowles - piano
 Tommy Tedesco - guitar/banjo
 Shelly Manne - drums

Revivals 
The first revival featured the characters as part on the 1993 incarnation of The Pink Panther. The characters remained unchanged, though unlike the original 1969-1971 cartoons, they do not appear in their own segments but rather are included in segments featuring the Pink Panther (now voiced by Matt Frewer). John Byner returned to voice both Charlie Ant and the Aardvark.

The second revival occurred in 2010 as part of Pink Panther and Pals. Eddie Garvar (occasionally John Over) voices the Aardvark, who retains his previous characterization. Kel Mitchell, using his natural voice, voices the Ant.

Home video 
The complete series was digitally remastered and issued on its own single-disc DVD collection by MGM Home Entertainment/20th Century Fox Home Entertainment in 2007 as The Pink Panther and Friends Volume 5: The Ant and the Aardvark.

The complete series reappeared in January 2009 as part of the DVD collection Pink Panther & Friends Classic Cartoon Collection by MGM Home Entertainment, a 9-disc DVD set containing all Pink Panther, Ant and the Aardvark, Inspector and (for the first time on DVD) Roland and Rattfink cartoons.

The Ant and the Aardvark was released onto Region 1/A Blu-ray and DVD on 27 April 2016.

See also
 Tom and Jerry
 Wile E. Coyote and the Road Runner

References

External links 
 Big Cartoon Database
 "The Ant & the Aardvark" at Don Markstein's Toonopedia. Archived from the original on August 21, 2015.

1969 American television series debuts
1971 American television series endings
Film characters introduced in 1969
Film series introduced in 1969
Animated film series
DePatie–Freleng Enterprises
Fictional aardvarks
Fictional ants
Fictional rivalries
Television series by MGM Television
The Pink Panther Show